The FAW MV3 is the third generation military truck developed by First Automobile Works (FAW). Since 2011, FAW MV3 is the standardized military truck used widely by the Chinese People's Liberation Army. The utility truck has two configurations, 4x4 and more commonly 6x6, both featuring cross-country mobility. The truck also comes with options on single or double armored cabs. It's the Chinese equivalent of US Army M939 and MTVR.

The development of the MV3 finished in 2011, and won the Army endorsement from a competition in 2011 against three other state-owned military vehicle manufacturing corporation. MV3 will be the next generation universal transport/cargo truck, replacing Dongfeng EQ240/EQ2081 and Dongfeng EQ245/EQ2100.

Variants
CTM-131 Chinese military designation. 6x6 configuration with double cab. 5 ton payload capacity.
CTM-132 Chinese military designation. 6x6 configuration with single cab. 5 ton payload capacity.
CTM-133 Chinese military designation. 4x4 configuration with double cab. 3.5 ton payload capacity.
CTM-134 Chinese military designation. 4x4 configuration with single cab. 3.5 ton payload capacity.
PCL-161 122 mm truck-mounted howitzer (self-propelled howitzer, SPH) capable of rapid deployment, based on CTM-133 chassis. 
PHL-XX Modular multiple launch rocket system based on CTM-133 chassis.
AFT-10 Carrier Two HJ-10 missiles and electro-optical sensor fitted on CTM-133 chassis.

References

Military trucks of China
People's Liberation Army